Maytenus manabiensis is a species of plant in the family Celastraceae. It is a tree endemic to Ecuador.  Its natural habitat is subtropical or tropical moist lowland forests. It is threatened by habitat loss.

References

manabiensis
Endemic flora of Ecuador
Trees of Ecuador
Critically endangered flora of South America
Taxonomy articles created by Polbot
Taxobox binomials not recognized by IUCN